Još uvek sanjam (Najveći hitovi) (trans. I'm Still Dreaming (Greatest Hits)) is a compilation album by Serbian and former Yugoslav rock band Galija.

The first five tracks on the album are rerecorded tracks from Galija's old albums, and the last six tracks are from Galija's two previous studio albums, Daleko je Sunce and Korak do slobode.

Track listing
"Gospi" - 3:40
"Još uvek sanjam" - 4:30
"Digni ruku" - 3:20
"Put" - 6:00
"Burna pijana noć" - 4:10
"Da li si spavala" - 3:04
"Kad me pogledaš" - 4:45
"Na tvojim usnama" - 3:10
"Zebre i bizoni" - 3:00
"Sloboda" - 3:30
"Mi znamo sudbu" - 3:28
"Skadarska" - 4:15

Credits
Nenad Milosavljević - vocals
Predrag Milosavljević - vocals
Jean Jacques Roscam - guitar
Bata Zlatković - flute
Dušan Karadžić - bass guitar
Boban Pavlović - drums
Zoran Radosavljević - bass guitar
Predrag Milanović - bass guitar

1990 compilation albums
PGP-RTB compilation albums
Galija compilation albums